Blackstar (stylised as ★) is the 26th and final studio album by English musician David Bowie. It was released worldwide on 8January 2016, coinciding with Bowie's 69th birthday, through his ISO label, Columbia Records and Sony Music. The album was primarily recorded in secret between the Magic Shop and Human Worldwide Studios in New York City with Bowie's longtime co-producer Tony Visconti and a group of local jazz musicians: saxophonist Donny McCaslin, pianist Jason Lindner, bassist Tim Lefebvre and drummer Mark Guiliana; guitarist Ben Monder joined the ensemble for the final sessions, while James Murphy of LCD Soundsystem contributed percussion. The album is more experimental than its predecessor The Next Day (2013), combining art rock with different styles of jazz.

For the album, Bowie took inspiration from electronic groups such as Boards of Canada as well as hip hop artists such as Kendrick Lamar and Death Grips. The album contains re-recorded versions of two songs, "Sue (Or in a Season of Crime)" and "'Tis a Pity She Was a Whore", both of which were originally released in 2014. It was preceded by the singles "Blackstar" and "Lazarus", both of which were supported by music videos. The album cover, designed by Jonathan Barnbrook, features a large black star with five star segments at the bottom that spell out the word "BOWIE".

Two days after its release, Bowie died of liver cancer; his illness had not been revealed to the public until then. Visconti described the album as Bowie's intended swan song and a "parting gift" for his fans before his death. Upon release, the album was met with critical acclaim and commercial success, topping charts in a number of countries in the wake of Bowie's death and becoming Bowie's only album to top the US Billboard 200. The album remained at the number-one position on the UK Albums Chart for three weeks. It was the fifth-best-selling album of the year, worldwide. It has since been certified Gold and Platinum in the US and the UK, respectively.

At the 59th Annual Grammy Awards, the album won awards for Best Alternative Music Album, Best Engineered Album, Non-Classical and Best Recording Package, with the title track winning for Best Rock Performance and Best Rock Song. The album was also awarded the British Album of the Year at the 2017 Brit Awards. It was listed as one of the best albums of 2016 and later the 2010s decade by numerous publications. In the years following his death, commentators have named Blackstar one of Bowie's greatest albums, and was included in the 2018 edition of Robert Dimery's book 1001 Albums You Must Hear Before You Die.

Background and recording
David Bowie recorded Blackstar while suffering from liver cancer. Like his previous album The Next Day (2013), recording took place in secret at the Magic Shop and Human Worldwide Studios in New York City, with production being co-handled by Bowie and longtime collaborator Tony Visconti. Bowie began writing and making demos for songs that appear on Blackstar as soon as sessions for The Next Day concluded. Two songs, "Sue (Or in a Season of Crime)" and "'Tis a Pity She Was a Whore", had been previously released, but were re-recorded for Blackstar. The title of the latter derives from 'Tis Pity She's a Whore, a play by the 17th century English dramatist John Ford. The song "Lazarus" was included in Bowie's Off-Broadway musical of the same name.

Bowie recruited a local New York jazz quartet led by saxophonist Donny McCaslin, and featuring other musicians including drummer Mark Guiliana, pianist Jason Lindner and bassist Tim Lefebvre, as the backing band for the sessions. McCaslin and Guiliana previously played on the original version of "Sue". The musicians received demos from Bowie in December 2014 in preparation for the sessions at the start of the new year. Visconti told Mojo: "If we'd used [Bowie's] former musicians they would be rock people playing jazz...Having jazz guys play rock music turns it upside down." Lefebvre later said that the band's chemistry made the sessions much easier. Bowie knew exactly what he wanted, so Lefebvre felt special that Bowie chose a band that was a "unit" and not a random set of studio musicians. Bowie also encouraged the band to try new things and experiment with ideas; Lindner told Rolling Stone, "He gave us the freedom to really just play, sort of be ourselves, and if we were hearing anything in particular, to try it out." Visconti gave consistent praise to the band, saying "They can play something at the drop of a dime".

Recording began at the Magic Shop in the first week of 2015. The very first day in the studio, Lefebvre and Lindner met Bowie, Visconti and engineer Kevin Killen for the first time, after which they got straight to work. According to biographer Nicholas Pegg, most of the rhythm tracks were recorded in one or two takes. Tracks for both Blackstar and the Lazarus musical were recorded: "Lazarus", "No Plan", the re-working of "'Tis a Pity She Was a Whore" and "When I Met You". During the week, Bowie celebrated his 68th birthday; his wife Iman visited him in the studio and the band played an avant-garde rendition of "Happy Birthday". Following the January sessions, further recording commenced in blocks; according to Pegg, they lasted four to six days each, in the first week of February and the third week of March. Bowie emailed demos to the musicians before each session. The backing band were reportedly unaware of Bowie's declining health – according to McCaslin, the band worked with Bowie "essentially from 11 to 4 every day", while Lefebvre stated that "it never looked to us like he was sick".

James Murphy of LCD Soundsystem was present during the second block of recording; his work on Arcade Fire's Reflektor inspired Bowie to create a remix of "Love Is Lost" for The Next Day Extra. Recorded in early February was "Dollar Days", "Girl Loves Me", "Someday" and the remake of "Sue (Or In a Season of Crime)". "Dollar Days" was created without a preliminary demo being made for the song. McCaslin later stated that Bowie one day "just picked up a guitar... he had this little idea, and we just learned it right there in the studio." For the March sessions, the band were joined by jazz guitarist Ben Monder, who played on the original recording of "Sue". Songs recorded included "Blackstar", "I Can't Give Everything Away", "Killing a Little Time" and a remake of "Someday" (now retitled "Blaze"). Although Bowie performed his vocals live while the band were playing during the Magic Shop sessions, he and Visconti moved to Human Worldwide studios in April for proper recording. The majority of his vocals were recorded from scratch between April and May, although some vocals from the Magic Shop sessions, including part of "I Can't Give Everything Away" and the full vocal for "No Plan" were kept. The final master mix is credited to English engineer Tom Elmhirst, although Bowie and Visconti oversaw the mixing sessions in general.

Composition and influences
According to Visconti, he and Bowie deliberately attempted "to avoid rock'n'roll" while making the album. They listened to rapper Kendrick Lamar's 2015 album To Pimp a Butterfly during the recording sessions and cited it as an influence. Discussing the album, Visconti said "We wound up with nothing like that, but we loved the fact that Kendrick was so open-minded and he didn't do a straight-up hip-hop record. He threw everything on there, and that's exactly what we wanted to do." Electronic duo Boards of Canada and experimental hip hop trio Death Grips have also been cited as influences. According to Pegg, another album Bowie listened to during the sessions was D'Angelo's Black Messiah (2014), which featured a fusion of soul, jazz and funk that was reminiscent of Bowie's work on "Sue (Or in a Season of Crime)".

Music

The music on Blackstar has been characterised as incorporating art rock, jazz, experimental jazz, free jazz, and experimental rock, as well as elements of industrial rock, folk-pop and hip hop. Bryan Wawzenek of Ultimate Classic Rock writes that it was his most experimental album in years. The saxophone was the first instrument Bowie learned; he was an avid jazz listener in his youth and had occasionally worked with jazz musicians in the past. The album's title track incorporates nu jazz while progressing through a drum and bass–style rhythm, an acid house–inspired portion of the instrumental, a saxophone solo, and a lower-tempo blues-like section. Ten minutes in length, it originally began as two separate melodies before being merged to one single piece. Andy Greene of Rolling Stone said that the re-recording of "'Tis a Pity She Was a Whore" was "powered by a hip hop beat and free-form sax", unlike the original, which was described by Dalton as "a propulsive, roaring, heavily electronic wall of sound." "Lazarus" is described by Pegg as "an intense, brooding threnody". Although some critics felt the track begins to drag as it goes on, Pegg believes it's one of the album's "most luminous moments". Although the original version of "Sue (Or in a Season of Crime)" featured brass-heavy instrumentation and a bebop-jazz arrangement, Stephen Dalton of Classic Rock magazine writes that the re-recorded version "feels sharper, denser and heavier", with added funk rock guitar lines and "percussive shudders". "Girl Loves Me" features synthesisers, "acrobatic" drumming, strings and "bouncing" bass. "Dollar Days", the sixth track, contains a sax solo and an arrangement that Dalton considers reminiscent of Bowie's work on Young Americans (1975). Biographer Chris O'Leary believes "Dollar Days" has "the lushest arrangement" on the album. In the final track, "I Can't Give Everything Away", Bowie plays a harmonica solo similar to one from his instrumental track "A New Career in a New Town" off his 1977 album Low.

Lyrics
Billboard and CNN wrote that Bowie's lyrics seem to address his impending death, with CNN noting that the album "reveals a man who appears to be grappling with his own mortality". The title track features the lyrics: "Something happened on the day he died / Spirit rose a metre and stepped aside / somebody else took his place, and bravely cried, 'I'm a blackstar, I'm a blackstar'"; Jesse Kinos-Goodin of CBC Music felt these lyrics represented Bowie reflecting on his life and impending death. "Lazarus" features the lines "Look up here, I'm in heaven / I've got scars that can't be seen", which appeared in many publications following Bowie's death on 10 January. "Girl Loves Me" was notable for its inclusion of Nadsat, a fictional language created by Anthony Burgess for his 1962 novel A Clockwork Orange, where it was used very often. It also included Polari, a type of slang used commonly in England by homosexual men during the mid-20th century. The refrain, the explicit "Where the fuck did Monday go?", was interpreted by Pegg as the kind of desperation from a man who knows his time is running out. "Dollar Days" contains the lyrics "don't believe for just one second I'm forgetting you — I'm trying to, I'm dying to/too", which Pegg and O'Leary note is a very dark pun. "I Can't Give Everything Away" contains the line "Seeing more and feeling less / Saying no but meaning yes / This is all I ever meant / That's the message that I sent", which led Neil McCormick of The Daily Telegraph to think of the song as a point where "Bowie sounds like he is grappling with his own mystery."

Artwork and packaging

The artwork for Blackstar was designed by Jonathan Barnbrook, who filled the same role on Heathen (2002), Reality (2003) and The Next Day. The cover's star image is credited to NASA in the CD booklet. The five star segments below the main star form the word "BOWIE" in stylised letters. The vinyl cover, in black, features the star as a cutout, revealing the record (with an all-black picture label) beneath. With the record removed, the black paper behind the cutout reveals a hidden picture of a starfield when the foldout sleeve is held up to a light source. It took more than four months for fans to discover the effect. The designer claimed there were many other surprises hidden in the LP's artwork. Music journalists noted that a "black star lesion," usually found inside a breast, suggests to medical practitioners evidence of certain types of cancer. The sleeve is the first and only Bowie sleeve to not feature an image of the artist himself. After Bowie's death, Barnbrook released the Blackstar design elements under a Creative Commons NonCommercial-ShareAlike license.

Release
The title track was released as the album's lead single on 19November 2015 and used as the opening music for the television series The Last Panthers. Originally over 11 minutes in length, Bowie and Visconti shortened it to 9:57 after finding out that iTunes will not post digital singles for individual sale that exceeded 10 minutes. Although Visconti believed this policy was "total bullshit", Bowie was insistent on releasing it as a single, and didn't want both album and single versions, since that "gets confusing". The music video for "Blackstar", shot in September 2015 in a studio in Brooklyn, is a surreal ten-minute short film directed by Johan Renck (the director of The Last Panthers). It depicts a woman with a tail, played by Elisa Lasowski, discovering a dead astronaut and taking his jewel-encrusted skull to an ancient, otherworldly town. The astronaut's bones float toward a solar eclipse, while a circle of women perform a ritual with the skull in the town's centre. The short film won the award for Best Art Direction at the 2016 MTV Video Music Awards.

The second single, "Lazarus", was released on 17December 2015 as a digital download, and received its world premiere on BBC Radio 6 Music's Steve Lamacq Show the same day. A music video for "Lazarus", shot in November 2015 in a studio in Brooklyn and again directed by Renck, was released on 7January 2016, the day before the album's release. It prominently features Bowie, appearing with a bandage and buttons sewn over his eyes, lying on a deathbed. The video was nominated for three awards: Best Direction, Best Cinematography and Best Editing, at the 2016 MTV Video Music Awards.

Blackstar was released on 8January 2016, coinciding with Bowie's 69th birthday, through his ISO label, Columbia Records and Sony Music. Two days later on 10January, Bowie died of liver cancer; his illness had not been revealed to the public until then. Visconti described the album as Bowie's intended swan song and a "parting gift" for his fans before his death. Within days of the album's release, online retailer Amazon.com temporarily sold out of both the CD and LP editions. The third and final single, "I Can't Give Everything Away", was released posthumously on 6April.

An EP, No Plan, was released on 8January 2017, which would have been Bowie's 70th birthday. Apart from "Lazarus", the EP includes three songs, "No Plan", "Killing a Little Time" and "When I Met You", that were recorded during the Blackstar sessions, but were left off the album and subsequently appeared on the soundtrack album for the Lazarus musical in October 2016. In 2018, Jon Culshaw played Bowie in the BBC radio play The Final Take: Bowie in the Studio, an imagined account of Bowie as he works on the album and looks back over his life.

Critical reception

Blackstar was acclaimed by music critics and fans. On Metacritic, the album has an average score of 87 out of 100 based on 43 reviews, indicating "universal acclaim". Rolling Stone critic David Fricke called Blackstar "a ricochet of textural eccentricity and pictorial-shrapnel writing". Andy Gill of The Independent regarded the record as "the most extreme album of [Bowie's] entire career", stating that "Blackstar is as far as he's strayed from pop." Jon Pareles of The New York Times described the album as "at once emotive and cryptic, structured and spontaneous and, above all, willful, refusing to cater to the expectations of radio stations or fans". The Daily Telegraphs Neil McCormick hailed Blackstar as an "extraordinary" album which "suggests that, like a modern day Lazarus of pop, Bowie is well and truly back from beyond." Alexis Petridis of The Guardian praised the album, calling it "a rich, deep and strange album that feels like Bowie moving restlessly forward, his eyes fixed ahead: the position in which he's always made his greatest music." In a favourable review for Exclaim!, Michael Rancic wrote that Blackstar is "a defining statement from someone who isn't interested in living in the past, but rather, for the first time in a while, waiting for everyone else to catch up".

Reviewing for Q magazine, Tom Doyle wrote, "Blackstar is a more concise statement than The Next Day and a far, far more intriguing one." NME critic Sam Richards stated that Bowie had maintained his "formidable record of reinventing himself" on a "busy, bewildering and occasionally beautiful record", adding that "one of the few certainties we can take from this restless, relentlessly intriguing album is that David Bowie is positively allergic to the idea of heritage rock." Chris Gerard of PopMatters called the album "singular in its unique sound and vibe," describing it as "trippy and majestic head-music spun from moonage daydreams and made for gliding in and out of life." Leah Greenblatt of Entertainment Weekly considered the album Bowie's best work in years. In a review published before his death, Greenblatt felt the album contained enough themes and imagery that could "probably be dissected for days or even weeks." In a review before Bowie's death, Ryan Dombal of Pitchfork wrote: "This tortured immortality is no gimmick: Bowie will live on long after the man has died. For now, though, he's making the most of his latest reawakening, adding to the myth while the myth is his to hold."

Barry Walters of NPR, reviewing the album the day after Bowie's death, believed the album "resonates precisely because it favors emotion over meaning." Walters felt that the album is "so startling" because it reminded listeners that even though Bowie was long past his golden years, it is almost as if he never left them. He concluded the review stating "even while staring down death, [he] reversed his claim on "Station to Station" so many years ago: It's never too late to be grateful." Writing for The A.V. Club, which chose it as the best album of 2016, Sean O'Neal described Blackstar as "a sonically adventurous album that proves Bowie was always one step ahead—where he'll now remain in perpetuity." Sandra Sperounes of the Edmonton Journal stated that Bowie kept true to the artistic statement "An artist must be willing to embrace failure as one step to evolving what it is he does. You have to be able to fail to accept it – otherwise you're not going to go anywhere. With Blackstar, he kept true to this artistic statement until his body failed. We have to accept it – the Starman is now returning to the heavens above. We can't begin to thank you enough for all your gifts."

Following Bowie's death, Bryan Wawzenek of Ultimate Classic Rock ranked Blackstar as Bowie's twelfth-greatest album, describing it as a throwback to his Berlin Trilogy. Although he felt it wasn't as "accessible" as The Next Day, he considered it a "great companion piece" and "a fitting end to one of rock's most influential careers." In 2018, Consequence of Sound ranked the album as Bowie's eighth-greatest, writing: "This is one of Bowie's most dynamic outings and a courageous triggering of a second creative wind." Praising the experimental nature and lyrics, staff writer Lior Phillips concluded "It's a startling reminder that the only way Bowie can transcend 49 years of artistry is by detaching from the Superstar he had become and transform into a new thing altogether." The album was also included in the 2018 edition of Robert Dimery's book 1001 Albums You Must Hear Before You Die. Pitchfork later listed the album as one of the greatest albums of the 2010s decade, calling it "a magnificent farewell to his audience."

Accolades
Blackstar was named one of the best albums of 2016 by numerous publications. The album was nominated for the Top Rock Album award at the 2016 Billboard Music Awards, but ultimately lost to Blurryface by Twenty One Pilots. At the end of 2016, Blackstar appeared on a number of critics' lists ranking the year's top albums. According to Metacritic, it was the most prominently ranked record of 2016. In The Village Voices annual Pazz & Jop critics poll, Blackstar finished at number one in the voting for 2016's top album. At the 59th Annual Grammy Awards in 2017, the album won awards for Best Alternative Music Album, Best Recording Package and Best Engineered Album, Non-Classical. In addition, the title track won both Best Rock Song and Best Rock Performance. Blackstar was later named as one of the greatest albums of the 2010s decade by numerous publications, including Billboard, Consequence of Sound, NME, Pitchfork, Rolling Stone, Slant Magazine and Stereogum.

Commercial performance
Blackstar was already on course to debut at number one on the UK Albums Chart prior to the announcement of Bowie's death on 10 January 2016, according to the Official Charts Company. The album debuted at number one after selling 146,000 copies in the first week (a week that saw four other Bowie albums in the Top 10 and a further seven in the Top 40, the latter equalling Elvis Presley's chart record) and became his tenth number one album in the UK. The album remained three weeks at number one, falling to number two behind another Bowie album, the compilation Best of Bowie (2002), which became the first ever album to get to number one in the UK because of streaming. As of January 2018, the album has sold 446,000 copies in the United Kingdom. Bowie was the biggest-selling vinyl artist of 2016 in the UK, with five albums in the vinyl Top 30, including Blackstar as the number one vinyl album of the year. It sold twice as many copies as the previous year's winner, Adele's 25.

In the US, the album debuted at number one on the US Billboard 200 chart, moving 181,000 copies in its first week. Its number one debut was previously anticipated by Billboard, though its total sales exceeded expectations by 51,000 copies. The album topped the iTunes chart following Bowie's death, with Best of Bowie (2002) placing second. It was Bowie's first number one in the US and best weekly sales figure. It was the 14th-best-selling album in the US in 2016, with 448,000 copies sold that year. After news of his death, some music stores in both the US and UK sold out of copies. The album also peaked at number one in 24 countries, number two in Greece and Mexico, number four in Hungary, and number five in Japan. It has since been certified Gold in Germany, New Zealand, Portugal, Spain, Sweden and the US, certified Platinum in Australia, Austria, Belgium, Canada, Denmark, France, Italy, Poland, Switzerland and the UK, and 2× Platinum in the Netherlands. According to the International Federation of the Phonographic Industry (IFPI), it was the fifth-best-selling album of the year, worldwide. It has sold more than 1,900,000 copies as of April 2017.

Track listing

Notes

"Sue (Or in a Season of Crime)" contains elements from "Brand New Heavy" by Plastic Soul, written by Bateman and Bhamra. The latter's surname is consistently misspelled as "Bharma" in the album's liner notes.

Personnel
Personnel adapted from Blackstar liner notes.

Musicians
David Bowie – vocals, acoustic guitar, Fender guitar , harmonica , string arrangement 
Donny McCaslin – tenor saxophone, flute
Jason Lindner – piano, Wurlitzer organ, keyboards
Tim Lefebvre – bass
Mark Guiliana – drums, percussion
Ben Monder – guitar
Tony Visconti – strings 
James Murphy – percussion 
Erin Tonkon – backing vocals 

Production
David Bowie – production, mixing
Tony Visconti – production, mixing, engineering
Tom Elmhirst – final master mixing
Joe LaPorta – mastering
Kevin Killen – engineering
Kabir Hermon – assistant engineering
Erin Tonkon – assistant engineering
Joe Visciano – mixing assistance

Artwork
Barnbrook – album design
Jimmy King – photography
Johan Renck – photography 
NASA – star image

Charts

Weekly charts

Monthly charts

Year-end charts

Decade-end chart

Certifications

Release history

Notes

References

Book sources

External links
 

2016 albums
Albums produced by Tony Visconti
Art rock albums by English artists
Brit Award for British Album of the Year
Columbia Records albums
David Bowie albums
Death in music
Grammy Award for Best Alternative Music Album
Grammy Award for Best Engineered Album, Non-Classical
Jazz fusion albums by English artists
RCA Records albums